Scagea is a genus of plants under the family Picrodendraceae described as a genus in 1986.

The entire genus is endemic to New Caledonia.

List of species 

 Scagea depauperata (Baill.) McPherson
 Scagea oligostemon  (Guillaumin) McPherson

References

Endemic flora of New Caledonia
Picrodendraceae
Malpighiales genera